Thomas N. Armstrong III (July 30, 1932, Portsmouth, Virginia – June 20, 2011, Manhattan) was an American museum curator who was director emeritus of the Abby Aldrich Rockefeller Folk Art Museum (1968–1971),
the Pennsylvania Academy of the Fine Arts (1971–1974), the Whitney Museum of American Art (1974–1990) and the Andy Warhol Museum (1993–1995). He is best known for more than quadrupling the size of the Whitney Museum's art holdings. He graduated from Cornell University with a bachelor's degree in art history in 1954, where he became a member of the Quill and Dagger society. He studied museum administration at the New York University Institute of Fine Arts in 1967.

Armstrong had a lifelong interest in gardening and joined the board of the Garden Conservancy in 1991, becoming Chairman in 1997. He also served on the advisory committees of Mount Vernon Estate and Gardens and Winterthur Museum & Country Estate, and was an Honorary Trustee of the National Building Museum and a Trustee of the New York School of Interior Design.

His book, "A Singular Vision," on the design of his glass house on Fishers Island, New York, was published by WW Norton in the fall of 2011.

References

1932 births
2011 deaths
Cornell University alumni
Directors of museums in the United States
New York University Institute of Fine Arts alumni
People from Portsmouth, Virginia
People associated with the Pennsylvania Academy of the Fine Arts
American art historians
Historians from Virginia

People associated with Winterthur Museum, Garden and Library